McKenzie is a town in Butler and Conecuh counties in the U.S. state of Alabama. The population was 530 at the 2010 census.

Geography
McKenzie is located in southern Butler County at  (31.542801, -86.719772). A portion of the town extends south into Conecuh County. U.S. Route 31 passes to the west of the town center, leading north  to Greenville, the Butler County seat, and southwest  to Evergreen, the Conecuh County seat. State Route 55 leads southeast from McKenzie  to Andalusia.

Demographics

As of the census of 2000, there were 644 people, 284 households, and 170 families residing in the town. The racial makeup of the town was 76.09% White, 22.52% Black or African American, 0.47% Native American, 0.16% Asian, and 0.78% from two or more races. 0.31% of the population were Hispanic or Latino of any race.

There were 284 households, out of which 28.2% had children under the age of 18 living with them, 40.8% were married couples living together, 16.2% had a female householder with no husband present, and 40.1% were non-families. 37.7% of all households were made up of individuals, and 22.2% had someone living alone who was 65 years of age or older. The average household size was 2.27 and the average family size was 3.04.

In the town, the age distribution of the population shows 25.3% under the age of 18, 7.5% from 18 to 24, 24.5% from 25 to 44, 21.4% from 45 to 64, and 21.3% who were 65 years of age or older. The median age was 41 years. For every 100 females, there were 86.1 males. For every 100 females age 18 and over, there were 77.5 males.

The median income for a household in the town was $18,173, and the median income for a family was $24,423. Males had a median income of $23,077 versus $16,071 for females. The per capita income for the town was $10,359. About 21.1% of families and 27.5% of the population were below the poverty line, including 34.3% of those under age 18 and 33.3% of those age 65 or over.

Education
McKenzie High School is a K-12 school located in McKenzie.

References 

Towns in Alabama
Towns in Butler County, Alabama
Towns in Conecuh County, Alabama